David Guthrie Ovenstone (17 June 1913 — 1983) was a Scottish professional footballer who played as an outside forward. He played for several clubs in the Football League during his career.

References

1913 births
1983 deaths
Scottish footballers
Footballers from Fife
People from St Monans
Raith Rovers F.C. players
Bristol Rovers F.C. players
Queens Park Rangers F.C. players
Cardiff City F.C. players
Watford F.C. players
Southport F.C. players
Barry Town United F.C. players
English Football League players
Southern Football League players
Scottish Football League players
Association football outside forwards
Scottish Junior Football Association players
Rosslyn Juniors F.C. players